Alforja is a municipality in the comarca of Baix Camp, in the province of Tarragona, Catalonia, Spain.

The main monuments are Sant Miquel church in the town, as well as the shrines of Sant Antoni de Pàdua and Mare de Déu de Puigcerver outside its perimeter.

The Prades Mountains are located in the vicinity of this municipality.

Villages
Alforja, 1,207  
Les Barqueres, 91 
Els Garrigots, 11 
El Mas de l'Aleu, 4 
Portugal 141 
Sant Antoni 18 
Els Servians, 16

References

Tomàs Bonell, Jordi; Descobrir Catalunya, poble a poble, Prensa Catalana, Barcelona, 1994

External links

 Alforja Town Hall webpage* Government data pages 

Municipalities in Baix Camp
Populated places in Baix Camp